Michael Alan Westen is a fictional character played by Jeffrey Donovan in the television series Burn Notice, created by Matt Nix. Westen, a spy and former U.S. Army soldier serving in special operations, is widely known as a top CIA operative. As a result, in many circles, he is greatly feared. He abruptly became the subject of a burn notice while on an assignment.  Forced to return to his hometown of Miami, he finds himself cut off from the United States Intelligence Community.  While searching for answers about his burn notice, Michael becomes an unlicensed freelance private investigator/troubleshooter to help those who have unique problems, which can't involve the authorities.

Role in Burn Notice
Michael Alan Westen was born on January 7, 1967, and raised in Miami, the first of two sons to Frank and Madeline Westen. His father was a violent man, who would physically and emotionally abuse his sons as an obedience measure, and his mother did little to prevent it. His father would also take advantage of him, for example, he forced Michael to fake a seizure inside a Mr. Goodwrench store so his father could steal spark plugs. The last words his father said to him were "I'll see you in hell, boy."  Eight years before the beginning of the series, his father died. After persistent persuasion by his mother, Michael finally visited his father's grave. Michael's younger brother, Nate, is a compulsive gambler who has a history of stealing from Michael to fund his addiction. However, after helping Michael and almost dying, he has turned his life around, which Michael seems to have difficulty believing. After a brief quarrel with his brother, Michael wins his father's black 1973 Dodge Charger by a coin toss.

Michael enlisted in the U.S. Army when he was 17 years old, and his mother forged his father's signature so he could enlist because his father was such a bad influence on him. Nate also didn’t need a bad influence from both his brother and his father at the same time. Little is mentioned about his time in the Army but it is known that he was a Ranger and later a Green Beret. It was implied in an episode that he served in San Pedro, Laguna before he was recruited to work as a spy. He served for 15 years, working in Europe and the OPEC nations as a covert operative who did freelance work for the CIA. While on a mission in Nigeria, he received a burn notice from CIA superiors. After managing to embark on an airplane in Nigeria, Michael is deserted in Miami, with Fiona Glenanne, his ex-girlfriend.

Per the conditions of Michael's burn notice, his assets are frozen, his line of credit is destroyed, and he has no career history with which to seek employment. He is free to travel within Miami, but any attempts to leave the city will result in immediate arrest. Michael now has to find work that suits his unusual skillset and knowledge. He counts on longtime friends like Sam Axe, who informed on him to the FBI until midway through the first season, and Fiona to help him perform such tasks while arguing with his mother, and trying to find out who burned him and why.

Michael lives in a decrepit loft situated over a nightclub, with a bed, workbench, some barbells, a punching bag, an oven, a few chairs, a mid-1990s-era computer, and a refrigerator filled with yogurt and beer. Despite the Miami climate, there is no air conditioning. He obtained the loft in the pilot episode when he assisted his Russian landlord and club owner by ridding a drug dealer (Raymond, nicknamed "Sugar") who also lived on the premises. He also spends time at hotels in Miami, as well as at his mother's house. Though annoyed by his mother at times, Michael has shown love for her. Michael even cries when his mother risks her own life to save him and his nephew.

Upon returning to Miami, Michael was watched by the FBI. It was revealed that he was burned to be recruited by a mysterious organization and is contacted by a woman named Carla. After Carla was fatally shot by Fiona, Michael received an offer to replace her from a man referred to as the organization's "Management." He refused to take the job and lost the security detail and personal restrictions he had been under to protect him from the countless enemies he made as a CIA operative, choosing to be free from the organization's hold. It is later discovered that the organization was also protecting him from the rest of the world who were hunting the name Michael Westen.

Michael continued to work toward removing his burn notice and being reinstated in the CIA. Michael then approached CIA Agent Diego Garza, who became his point of contact for the CIA. Michael was also approached and later threatened by Tom Strickler, an "agent to the spies" with powerful connections. Tom had tried to remove Fiona from Michael's life, and Michael subsequently killed him. With Tom dead, the incident sparked a chain of events that led Diego to be murdered by Mason Gilroy, a former MI6 spy and freelance black ops psychopath. Michael ended up working with Gilroy to find out his plan. Michael eventually found out that Gilroy was working on securing the release of a high-risk fugitive named Simon Escher. Gilroy succeeded in freeing him but is later killed by Simon. In another revelation, Simon was the one responsible for the actions that got blamed on Michael when he was burned as Simon's profile was transferred to Michael. Simon forced Michael to bring Management to Miami but ends up being recaptured again when Michael overtook him.

After initially being taken away by the authorities, Michael is taken into Management's custody by use of their high-level government contacts. A member of the organization named Vaughn convinces Michael about a group of people in the world who are plotting assassinations, political coups, funding terrorist organizations, and genocide, and are using the terrible effects of such actions to greatly profit. Michael agrees to help him to stop the people that broke Simon out of prison. During the process of investigating, Michael accidentally burns a spy named Jesse Porter.

Despite the objection from Fiona and his mother, Michael kept a secret from Jesse about his role in destroying his life. Later, Jesse discovered Michael's deception and vowed revenge. Just before Jessie found out, Michael found a close link to the organization behind Simon and a mysterious book code contained within an out-of-print family bible: power-broker and billionaire CEO of Drake Technologies John Barrett. Michael offered to trade him the stolen bible in exchange for shedding some light on who he's up against and what the bible (as a book code) decrypts – the true identities of the organization that burned Michael. Management– the people who burned him– are hidden within the United States government, private-military corporations, and various other powerful organizations. Barrett planned on recruiting Michael to help him eliminate them. During the exchange of the case, Michael was shot by Jesse during a confrontation with Vaughn's and Barrett's teams. Michael, bleeding, was taken by Barrett. Michael then caused the car he was in to crash, leaving Barrett dead. Michael survives the accident and manages to crawl out of the wreckage. With Michael bleeding out and unconscious, someone steals the case.

Michael eventually recovered from his injuries. With the help of Fiona, Sam, and Jesse, Michael was able to recover the information on Management. Michael and Jessie turned over the flash drive to Jesse's old CIA handler Marv in exchange for Michael testifying to everything he knows about the organization. Seconds after the handoff Marv is killed by men posing as Homeland Security agents and the flash drive is stolen by Tyler Brennen, an enemy Michael made during the second season, who dislikes him even more after their next encounter in season three, and is one of the most intelligent villains he has encountered. Brennen, threatening to expose Michael's betrayal to Vaughn, blackmailed Michael into killing the people on the list who burned him. Brennen is murdered by Larry Sizemore who was recruited by Brennan to be Michael's partner for the killings. Michael was able to defeat Larry, but Vaughn learned of Michael's betrayal. Vaughn and his team go after Michael and those around him but are arrested. Michael was then taken by two mysterious men to Washington, D.C., and was met by an unknown acquaintance. The unknown acquaintance turns out to be Raines, Michael's former recruiter, who helps Michael hunt down every member of the organization in an attempt to get Michael un-burned. After Michael has successfully eliminated every member, another spy he had been working with, his handler, Max, is murdered and Michael is framed for the murder. Agent Pearce, who's been sent by the CIA to investigate Max's murder, serves as Michael's new agency contact. Michael must do what he can to aid the CIA's investigation while keeping the evidence from leading to his doorstep. It clues back to him and Pearce takes him in.

After he discovers the killer is a Romanian named Tavian Korzha the CIA lets Michael talk to him and he throws himself off a 5-story unfinished parking structure. Larry comes back and kidnaps a psychiatrist named Anson Fullerton, holding his wife hostage, forcing Michael to help him break into the British consulate, frame several British government personnel, and gain two million dollars. Larry reveals that he plans on killing Michael after Fi and Sam find Anson's wife had been blown up. Fiona plants a small explosive to kill Larry. The building explodes from the bottom, killing two security guards inside. It turns out that Anson planted the bomb and framed Fi. He is the co-founder of the organization that burned Michael and threatened to have the CIA and MI6 after Fi if Michael does not do his dirty work. It is revealed that later in his life, Michael's father met Anson and admitted his sorrow that he never got the chance to apologize to his son. Anson used him to gain information on Michael, and when Frank became suspicious, Anson arranged for his death.

Eventually, Fiona grows tired of Michael working for Anson and turns herself in to the FBI when Anson tries to get Michael to burn a CIA operations team for him. Michael arrives just as Fiona surrenders. Michael becomes enraged and chases Anson to a chemical plant in the Florida Keys. Anson outwits Michael by rigging the building to explode and attaching the detonator to a dead-man switch. Michael again vows to go after Anson and bring him in dead or alive, despite the support of Agent Pierce and the CIA.

By working with Rebecca, Anson's partner, who was also blackmailed by Anson, he tracks Anson down to Atlantic City and goes after him with Jessie, Pearce, and Nate. Michael's life takes a further turn for the worse when Nate is killed during Anson's assassination. As such, Michael, Madeline, Sam, Fiona, and Jesse are all hell-bent on exacting revenge for Nate's murder.

Eventually, Michael, with his former mentor Tom Card helping him, tracks Nate's killer, Tyler Gray, to Panama. After Michael successfully captures him, Gray reveals Card was the one who pulled the strings behind Anson's murder, since Card had been working with Anson and Card decided to kill Anson to keep him from talking. The mission to Panama was supposed to be a suicide mission for Michael and his friends. After barely escaping Card's air strike, Michael and the others attempt to get back to Miami, all the while learning that Gray had been lied to by Card about what he was told about Michael. After realizing Michael wasn't the person he was told, Gray agrees to help him take down Card.

Returning to Miami, Gray assists Michael in gathering intel on Card, but when Card discovers Gray's betrayal, Card fatally shoots Gray, makes it look like a struggle, and tries to convince Michael that they can do "great things" and has always been proud of him. However, Michael, unable to forgive Card for what he did and knowing what he's capable of, shoots Card through the head, killing him in cold blood. With the help of his friends, they barely escape as Olivia Riley, a ruthless agent for the CIA who "wrote the book on counterintelligence" goes after them and swears she will not stop until they are all dead.

Knowing they can't stay in the country anymore, Michael and the others (including Madeline) all attempt to leave the country with the help of Calvin Schmidt, a smuggler, but Riley tracks them down. When Riley resorts to using drug cartels to take down Michael after several failed attempts, Michael asks an old friend, CSS Agent Jason Bly, to assist him in proving Riley's betrayal, only for Bly to die in the process, along with the evidence. Not wanting Bly to die for nothing, Michael plays a dangerous game of chicken with Riley and the Coast Guard, after which Riley backs down and surrenders her complicity to the CIA deputy chief. After several months, Michael's friends are released, but Michael had to make a deal to do so; going on a deep cover job to take down the leader of a terrorist organization, prompting Fi to be disgusted, stating Michael did what he wanted to and backs away, heart-broken, leaving Michael distraught.

During the 100th episode of the series, it is shown how Michael and Fiona first met as spies in Ireland. Michael is struggling to ensure his friends and family remain free of the agency's grasp on what is his final mission to clear his name. Slowly but surely Michael begins to lose himself and a firm grip on his morals, succumbing to the mission. He proves this by sleeping with Sonya and killing an old friend of his. When Michael discovers that the CIA put Simon in charge of the capture team, he begins to question their beliefs. Michael kills Simon just as the capture team's backup arrives, and decides to protect James. He admits his deception to James, who is angry, but has the plan to continue his organization by putting Michael and Sonya in charge, and allowing Michael to "capture" him. Michael's friends refuse to believe he's given up on the CIA and form a plan to abduct him, but he fights against Sam and warns them to stay out of his way. Fearing he's lost his integrity, Fiona tracks Michael to the site for James' "capture".

Sonya tells Michael that if Fi doesn't leave, Sonya will have her killed. Michael hesitates but shoots Sonya before she can kill Fiona. James witnesses this from a helicopter and orders his men to kill Michael and Fiona. Sam and Jesse help Michael and Fiona escape, and they go on the offensive, tracking down a data center used by James' organization and stealing data that they could then use to unravel the entire organization. James arrives to confront them, threatening to have Madeline killed; however, Madeline sacrifices herself to kill James' hit squad and protect Jesse and Charlie. In the shootout, James is killed, but charges in the building detonate and Michael and Fiona were considered dead in the explosion.

Unknown to the CIA, Michael and Fiona survived. Believed dead, they fled the United States with Charlie and settled down to raise him in peace and obscurity in Ireland.

Concept and creation
Burn Notice creator Matt Nix said in a late 2010 interview

Characterization
LA Weekly described Michael as "Jim Rockford and MacGyver filtered through Carl Hiaasen."  Bruce Campbell comments on Michael Westen: "Well, the idea is being a CIA agent, Michael Westen can take his skills, you know, MacGyver-ish type skills and make a shotgun out of a twig."

Michael's romantic relationships are a significant source of subplots in Burn Notice. It is revealed in the episode "Sins of Omission" that ten years previous, Michael was engaged to a professional thief named Samantha, but they never married and eventually separated. Around that time, Michael met Fiona Glenanne, an IRA bomb maker and weapons expert, while undercover in Ireland. Their relationship also ended when Michael was extracted, though Fiona became aware of Michael's real name and position as a US intelligence operative. During the course of the series, Fiona helps Michael with his various cases and his investigations in Miami, and they still have a close, if strained, relationship. While Fiona plays coy during most of Season 1, during Season 2 it is apparent that they are moving toward a reconciliation. When Fiona investigates a bomb maker's home and a fire erupts that consumes the entire building, Michael believes that she had been killed in the fire, and discovers her alive and well at his apartment, albeit without a cellphone that was destroyed. Realizing that Michael was on the verge of a breakdown over her possible death, the two make love. In the end after everyone believed they were dead Michael and Fiona are seen in what seems to be a beautiful cottage in Ireland. The two are raising Charlie as their son. Michael worries about what he will tell Charlie when he is older and Fiona tells him to tell Charlie the truth. He asks "where would I start" and she tells him to start from the beginning and she tells him to start with "My name is Michael Westen. I used to be a spy".

Michael's family is also included in the show. In the pilot episode, Michael once remarked that his mother "would have been a great intelligence analyst.  She could find you if you were buried in the middle of the Gobi Desert and ask you why you didn't come home for Thanksgiving dinner." She is also a provider for some of Michael's cases by suggesting friends who are in trouble.  His mother in particular is at times demanding and a valuable asset, and has recently been used to conduct initial surveillance. She's also revealed to have a deep understanding of psychology and interrogation, after she manages to coerce information out of a smuggler within minutes of Fiona and Sam having given up. Despite being left in the dark for much of the series, she is now much more involved and aware of Michael's operations, though she seems to accept this as a matter of course.

While Michael begins working harder towards being recalled to active service and working for a mercenary, Fiona grows more and more distant. Michael strikes Fiona as part of maintaining a cover identity. Fiona claims that doing this work is changing Michael, and that she can't stay and watch it happen, and plans to move back to Ireland. These plans are curtailed when both Fiona's brother and an exiled Irish mercenary arrive. The exiled Irish mercenary kidnaps Fiona, and Michael's original Irish cover is blown. When Michael and Sam attempt a rescue, Fiona is shot in the arm when she jumps off the pier to escape the gunfire. Michael panics when he sees Fiona float to the surface unconscious and quickly pulls her out and is relieved when she comes to. Fiona's brother tells Michael that Fiona, now associated with a foreign intelligence operative, will almost certainly be killed if she returns to Ireland, though he tells Michael that he is proud to know his sister chose well.  This incident strengthens their bond again, and soon thereafter they have sex at a hotel.  Michael and Fiona experience tensions afterwards while he continues to focus on his burn notice with the CIA.

As a covert operative, Michael is incredibly resourceful and holds an extensive knowledge of topics including bushcraft, post-traumatic stress disorder, escapology, chemistry, electrical engineering, mechanical engineering, medicine, surgery, and criminal psychology, despite a remark by a client and former friend that he "vanished before high school graduation".  During the second season finale in a car chase, Michael is able to fashion a quick explosive out of chemicals found in his glove compartment.  As a covert operative, Michael is also a keen bluffer, once being able to bluff an arms dealer to believe that he transferred $200 000 into his account (a ruse that would have been found out by a bank manager in Zurich in a few minutes) or making a bank robber believe that he was a doctor.  Known by his professional reputation, Michael is regarded with fear by people associated with the intelligence community. A Spetsnaz wet work operative remarked that "everyone in Russian Special Forces has heard of the name Michael Westen.  He is a myth like the bogeyman." He was also personally offered a job by the Head of the Libyan Secret Police, who stated that their intelligence services were not known for being gentle.  In one episode, Larry once quipped, "Where is the old Michael Westen I knew? The one who would have left behind a bloodbath with a smile on his face?" Despite being professionally regarded as a cold killer, Michael is hesitant to kill anyone unless he had to, once needing Victor to tell him that he had to do it in order to sell the story to Management.  That is not to say that Michael would not kill, where during the third season finale he might have killed Simon and only stopped when Management asked him not to, and murders Strickler, a spy broker, in his home earlier in the season after learning he passed information about Fiona's whereabouts to her enemies.

As a character, Michael is seen to have several 'trademark' characteristics. He wears expensive suits (during one episode he reveals the label showing the suit to be Armani, and always wears the same pair of Oliver Peoples sunglasses, which he at one points states to have retrieved from an Algerian special ops soldier that he tangled with who "didn't need them anymore." At end of Season 2, Michael takes off his sunglasses for his meeting with Management before jumping out of the latter's helicopter, although he obtains another pair. His favorite snack food is yogurt, particularly blueberry, and he keeps a ready supply in his refrigerator.

Appearances
Michael Westen appears in tie-in novels written by Tod Goldberg.

The official website for the show has a collection of short videos in which Michael dispenses advice for certain problems people have, such as how to evade an ex who's been following them or how to get a table at a restaurant that's booked solid.  Michael even explains how to break out of a prison in Turkmenistan, although he gives the camera a look before starting. In general, the "advice" is theoretically possible but impractical for most people. For instance, the explanation on how to break out of a prison in Turkmenistan ends with Michael telling the person to swim across the Caspian Sea.

Westen is also briefly mentioned in The League of Extraordinary Gentlemen Volume III: 2009 as a disgruntled former CIA agent providing intelligence to MI6.

References

External links
 USA Burn Notice: Michael Westen Character Bio at USA.com

Burn Notice characters
Fictional Central Intelligence Agency personnel
Fictional United States Army Special Forces personnel
Fictional private investigators
Fictional United States Army Rangers personnel
Fictional MCMAP practitioners
Television characters introduced in 2007
Fictional murderers
Fictional American secret agents
Fictional characters from Miami